Dartford is the principal town in the Borough of Dartford, Kent, England.
is situated adjacent to the London Borough of Bexley to its west. To its north, across the Thames estuary, is Thurrock in Essex, which can be reached via the Dartford Crossing.

The town centre lies in a valley through which the River Darent flows and where the old road from London to Dover crossed: hence the name, from Darent + ford. Dartford became a market town in medieval times and, although today it is principally a commuter town for Greater London, it has a long history of religious, industrial and cultural importance. It is an important rail hub; the main through-road now by-passes the town itself.

Geography

Dartford lies within the area known as the London Basin. The low-lying marsh to the north of the town consists of London Clay and the alluvium brought down by the two rivers—the Darent and the Cray—whose confluence is in this area. The higher land on which the town stands and through which the narrow Darent valley runs, consists of chalk surmounted by the Blackheath Beds of sand and gravel.

As a human settlement, Dartford became established as a river crossing-point with the coming of the Romans; and as a focal point between two routes: that from west to east being part of the main route connecting London with the Continent; and the southerly route following the Darent valley. As a result, the town's main road pattern makes the shape of letter 'T'. The Dartford Marshes to the north and the proximity of Crayford in the London Borough of Bexley to the west, mean that the town's growth is to the south and east. Wilmington is contiguous with the town to the south; whilst the almost continuous Thames Gateway development means that there is little to show the town boundary in an easterly direction.

Within the town boundaries there are several distinct areas: the town centre around the parish church and along the High Street; the Joyce Green area; Temple Hill estate constructed in 1947; the Brent; Fleet Downs; as well as two important areas of open space and several industrial estates. The open spaces are Central Park, alongside the river; and Dartford Heath.

Climate
Like most of the United Kingdom, Dartford has an oceanic climate.

History
In prehistoric times, the first people appeared in the Dartford area around 250,000 years ago: a tribe of prehistoric hunter-gatherers whose exemplar is called Swanscombe Man. Many other archaeological investigations have revealed a good picture of occupation of the district with important finds from the Stone Age, the Bronze Age and the Iron Age.

When the Romans engineered the Dover to London road (afterwards named Watling Street), it was necessary to cross the River Darent by ford, giving the settlement its name. Roman villas were built along the Darent Valley, and at Noviomagus (Crayford), close by. The Saxons may have established the first settlement where Dartford now stands. Dartford manor is mentioned in the Domesday Book, compiled in 1086, after the Norman conquest. It was then owned by the king.

During the medieval period Dartford was an important waypoint for pilgrims and travellers en route to Canterbury and the Continent, and various religious orders established themselves in the area. In the 12th century the Knights Templar had possession of the manor of Dartford; the National Trust property at Sutton-at-Hone, to the south of the town, is a remaining piece of that history. In the 14th century, a priory was established here, and two groups of friars—the Dominicans and the Franciscans—built hospitals here for the care of the sick. At this time the town became a small but important market town.

Wat Tyler, of Peasants' Revolt fame, might well have been a local hero, although three other towns in Kent all claim likewise, and there are reasons to doubt the strength of Tyler's connection to Dartford, though the existence of a town centre public house named after him could give credence to Dartford's claim. Dartford, however, cannot claim a monopoly on public houses named after Tyler.

It is probable that Dartford was a key meeting point early in the Peasants' Revolt with a detachment of Essex rebels marching south to join Kentish rebels at Dartford before accompanying them to Rochester and Canterbury in the first week of June 1381. Although lacking a leader, Kentishmen had assembled at Dartford around 5 June through a sense of county solidarity at the mistreatment of Robert Belling, a man claimed as a serf by Sir Simon Burley. Burley had abused his royal court connections to invoke the arrest of Belling and, despite a compromise being proposed by bailiffs in Gravesend, continued to demand the impossible £300 of silver for Belling's release. Having left for Rochester and Canterbury on 5 June, the rebels passed back through Dartford, swollen in number, a week later on 12 June en route for London.

In the 15th century, two kings of England became part of the town's history. Henry V marched through Dartford in November 1415 with his troops after fighting the French at the Battle of Agincourt; in 1422 Henry's body was taken to Holy Trinity Church by Edmund Lacey, Bishop of Exeter, who conducted a funeral. In March 1452, Richard, Duke of York, camped at the Brent allegedly with ten thousand men, waiting for a confrontation with King Henry VI. The Duke surrendered to the king in Dartford. The place of the camp is marked today by York Road, Dartford.

The 16th century saw significant changes to the hitherto agrarian basis of the market in Dartford, as new industries began to take shape (see below). The priory was destroyed in 1538 during the Dissolution of the Monasteries and a new manor house was subsequently constructed by King Henry VIII. In 1545, Henry held a series of meetings of his Privy Council in the town, and from 21 to 25 June 1545 Dartford was the seat of the national government. Henry's fourth wife Anne of Cleves lived at the new priory for four years before her death in 1557.

Many Protestants were executed during the reigns of Queen Mary (1553–1554) and Philip and Mary (1554–1558), including Christopher Wade, a Dartford linen-weaver who was burnt at the stake on the Brent in 1555. The Martyrs' Memorial on East Hill commemorates Wade and other Kentish Martyrs. In 1576 Dartford Grammar School was founded, part of the Tudor emphasis on education for ordinary people.

Industrial history

The earliest industries were those connected with agriculture, such as the brewing of traditional beers and ales. Lime-burning and chalk-mining also had their place. Fulling was another: the cleansing of wool needed a great deal of water, which the river could provide. This led to other water-based industries, using hydropower to operate machinery.

Upon his return in 1578 from Frobisher Bay in the Canadian Arctic with a reputed cargo of gold-bearing ore, Sir Martin Frobisher had the refining done on Powder Mill Lane in Dartford. However, the ore proved valueless and was used for road surfacing. Sir John Spielman set up the first paper mill in England at Dartford in 1588 on a site near Powder Mill Lane, and soon some 600 employees worked there, providing an invaluable source of local employment. Iron-making on the Weald was in full operation at this time, and iron ingots were sent to Dartford, to England's first iron-slitting mill, set up by the Darent at Dartford Creek in 1595 by Godfrey Box, an immigrant from the Low Countries. In 1785, John Hall, a millwright set up a workshop in Lowfield Street and began to make engines, boilers and machinery (some of it for the local gunpowder factory run by Miles Peter Andrews and the Pigou family), marking the foundation of J & E Hall, an engineering firm specialising in heavy engineering, and later refrigerating equipment, and, for 20 years from 1906, vehicle production, plus lifts and escalators.

From those humble beginnings in the 18th century was to come the industrial base on which the growth and prosperity of Dartford were founded. In 1840 the mustard factory of Saunders & Harrison was described as being "perhaps the largest in the kingdom". Dartford Paper Mills were built in 1862, when excise duty on paper was abolished. Between 1844 and 1939 the fabric printing works of Augustus Applegath were in being in Bullace Lane: again a firm using the waters of the river. RAF Joyce Green, at Long Reach, near Dartford was one of the first Royal Flying Corps airfields, It was established in 1911 by Vickers Limited (the aircraft and weapons manufacturer, who used it as an airfield and testing ground. It was superseded by Biggin Hill, and closed in 1919. The demand created by World War I meant that output at the local Vickers factory multiplied, with a positive effect on the local economy. Burroughs-Wellcome chemical works (later incorporated into GlaxoSmithKline) made Dartford a centre for the pharmaceutical industry. There had been a large power station at Littlebrook on the Thames, to the north of the town, from 1939 until its closure in 2015.  The station, including one of the tallest chimneys in the UK, was completely demolished in 2019.

Post-industrial economic plans
The Mazda motor manufacturer has its UK head office at the large Thames-side Crossways Business Park. Thomas Walter Jennings created the Vox musical brand, with products such as the AC15 and AC30 amplifiers originating in Dartford. In early 2006, the since-closed South East England Development Agency (SEEDA) purchased the former Unwins (an off-licence chain that went into administration in 2005) depot on the edge of the town. The warehouse was demolished and a business centre, The Base, built in its place. The Base will be managed by Basepoint Centres and funded by the non-departmental public body, HCA.

By 2018, the former GlaxoSmithKline manufacturing site in Mill Pond Road had been redeveloped with residential apartments and is known as Langley Square. Further regeneration is taking place at Market Street, to be known as Brewery Square.

Economy

Some of Dartford's key industries, including brewing, paper-making, flour milling and the manufacture of cement, suffered extreme decline in the 20th century, causing redundancies and unemployment. Swanscombe Cement Works (now redeveloped into Bluewater shopping centre) was closed by Blue Circle in 1990. This industry had been an economic boon to the area, but left behind a lot of derelict land and pollution.

The closure of Dartford's major employers: Seagers' Engineering Works, J & E Hall International, Vickers, the reduction and subsequent closure of Burroughs Wellcome (now GlaxoSmithKline), and the redevelopment of nearby Bexleyheath as a shopping town in the 1970s (and the more recent development of the Bluewater Shopping Centre), have had a negative effect on the economy of Dartford, but the town is still home to major brands such as Sainsbury's, W.H. Smiths, and Boots. With the opening of the major Bluewater regional shopping centre just outside the town, the high street has seen a growth in cheaper brands such as Primark and Wilko taking over empty premises. In the 1990s, the local economy was boosted by the establishment of a number of business parks in the area, the biggest being Crossways Business Park at the foot of the Queen Elizabeth II Bridge.

In 2007 Dartford saw an increase in the number of chain stores located in the town as B&Q, M&S Simply Food, TK Maxx and Asda Living opened new outlet stores in the town centre. Before this Safeway had taken part in the development of Dartford's second shopping centre, The Orchards, located next to the Orchard Theatre. The Safeway's site was eventually taken over by Waitrose but this closed in March 2014 and a new Aldi store opened in June 2015. The historical and once bustling main High Street and adjacent shopping centre, The Priory, continue to decline, and went into receivership in 2013. and the large department store previously occupied by the Co-operative has now been demolished, having been bought by Dartford Borough Council. The oldest independent business still trading in Dartford, the butchers Richardson & Sons in Lowfield Street, established in 1908, closed down in 2014 to make way for the proposed Lowfield centre superstore development. The problems with obtaining planning permission for this development and associated residential units were compounded by the recession. This created persistent delay in regeneration of the Lowfield Street site, and on 8 January 2015 it was finally announced that the Tesco plans were to be abandoned.

Culture and community

The Orchard Theatre is a professional theatre in the town centre, with a schedule including drama, dance, music and entertainment. The Mick Jagger Centre, within the grounds of Dartford Grammar School on Shepherds Lane, was completed in 2000 and provides facilities for community arts. library and Museum are located on Market Street.

Central Park, in the town centre, is used for various community events. It comprises  of land.

Sport
Dartford F.C. play at Princes Park Stadium and compete in the National League South. There are also three other senior clubs based in Dartford: Southern Counties East Football League Division 1 club Kent Football United F.C. and Kent County Football League clubs Fleetdown United who play at Heath Lane Lower, and Halls AFC who play at the Community Stadium at Princes Park.

Dartford Harriers Athletic Club was formed in 1922 and is currently based at Central Park. Originally founded as Dartford Rugby Football Club, the rugby players began taking part in cross-country runs in an effort to keep fit. Running soon became more popular with the players, and the club eventually dropped rugby around the end of the 1927–28 season, becoming Dartford Harriers AC. The club's running colours of blue and blue "hoops" are a legacy from the club's rugby origins, when the rugby players simply removed the sleeves from their old rugby shirts to create running vests.

Dartfordians Rugby Football Club have five adult teams and a large youth section, and play their home matches at War Memorial Club House on Bourne Road. Their first team currently plays in London 1 South, following promotion from London 2 South-East in the 2017–18 season.

Dartford is also home to Dartford and White Oak Triathlon Club; formed in 1988, it is one of the oldest British Triathlon Federation clubs in the UK. The club trains at The Bridge Estate, Dartford.

Sports centres in Dartford include the Becket Sports Centre, within the grounds of Dartford Grammar School on Shepherds Lane, which is the home of several sports groups.

Health

Between 1877 and 1903 the number of hospitals in Dartford rose to 11, together providing 10,000 hospital beds, at a time when the town's population was a little over 20,000. The majority of these have been closed, especially since the opening of Darent Valley Hospital. One of the best-known, Stone House Hospital, in Cotton Lane to the east of the town, was opened on 16 April 1866 as the "City of London Lunatic Asylum". It was, and still is, a large castellated structure built in spacious grounds. It remained under the direct administration of the City of London until 1948, when it was transferred to the National Health Service (NHS). It remains one of the largest and most visible structures in Dartford, and was until recently operated by the NHS to manage regional health care delivery, and was also home to a nursing school, Livingstone Hospital, on East Hill. The main buildings of this facility are now closed, and have been turned into luxury flats.

Transport

Roads
The route of a Celtic ancient trackway which the Romans later paved and identified as Iter III on the Antonine Itinerary, later to be called Watling Street, and which the current A2 roughly follows, passed close to the town. After the Romans left Britain, it fell out of use, as the town itself developed and traffic went into the town itself, the name Watling Street transferring to the new route. The introduction of stagecoach services increased the amount of traffic through the town, so that by the 18th century it had become necessary to control the upkeep of such a heavily used road. Turnpike Trusts were set up by Act of Parliament. Dartford was served by two: that for Watling Street; and the road south to Sevenoaks, both brought into being between 1750 and 1780.

From 1925 the A2 main road took traffic away from Dartford town centre via the Princes Road bypass. Today the original main road through the town is the A226. The former turnpike road south to Sevenoaks is now the A225). A newer by-pass is the A206, which skirts the town to the north. Its prime purpose is to carry traffic from the riverside industrial developments on to the Dartford Crossing from both west and east. Dartford is perhaps most well known for the latter, the main mode of crossing the River Thames to the east of London, where the southbound A282 (part of the London Orbital) crosses the river via the Queen Elizabeth II Bridge toll bridge, opened in 1991. The northbound carriageway crosses via the twin bore Dartford Tunnel. The first tunnel was opened in 1963, and the second in 1980.

Rail
Dartford railway station is located in the town centre and is connected to London via three National Rail routes. The first London to Dartford connection by rail was the North Kent Line via Woolwich Arsenal in 1849, connecting at Gravesend with the line to the Medway Towns. Later two more lines were built, the Dartford Loop Line through Sidcup, which opened in 1866, and the Bexleyheath Line, which opened in 1895. All the lines were electrified on 6 June 1926.

Buses
Dartford is served by many bus services provided by Transport for London, Arriva Kent Thameside and Go Coach Buses.

These routes connect Dartford with areas including Bexleyheath, Crayford, Erith, Gravesend, Greenhithe, Orpington, Sidcup, Swanley, Welling & Woolwich.

Education

Places of worship

The Parish Church, Holy Trinity, is situated on the western bank of the River Darent, from where a hermit would conduct travellers across the ford. The church was originally a 9th-century Saxon structure, but gained later Norman additions. In the 13th century a royal wedding was celebrated there; thus today the choristers are entitled to wear scarlet cassocks. Also on display within the church is a brass plaque commemorating the work of Richard Trevithick, the pioneer of steam propulsion, who, at the end of his career, lived, worked (at J & E Hall) and died in the town.

The graveyard is situated in St Edmund's Pleasance on the summit of East Hill (the place where Richard Trevithick is buried), which gave rise to a traditional and derogatory rhyme of Dartford's people: "Dirty Dartford, filthy people, bury their dead above the steeple." The church actually has no steeple; it has a tower featuring a ring of eight bells.

Twinned towns
Hanau
Gravelines

Notable people

The following are from or have lived in Dartford (or other connection if specified):
 Doreen Allen (1879–1963), militant suffragette
 Malcolm Allison (1927–2010), football player and manager
 Andrea Arnold (born 1961), Oscar and BAFTA winning film director
 George Barton (1808–1864), Sussex cricketer
 Martina Bergman-Österberg (1849–1915), physical education pioneer and founder of Dartford College
 Peter Blake (born 1932), pop artist
 Edward Brander (1845–1883), cricketer
 Richard Cant (born 1964), actor
 Dave Charnley (1935–2012), British Lightweight Champion boxer (1957–63)
 Ron Cooper (1932–2012), bicycle frame builder
 Mackenzie Crook (born 1971), actor
 Graham Dilley (1959–2011), Kent and England cricketer
 Peter Glaze (1917-1983), Comedian
 Len Goodman (born 1944), dancer and reality TV judge (Strictly Come Dancing)
 Ivor Gurney (1890–1937), composer and poet
 John Hall (1765-1836), founder of engineering business J & E Hall, based in Dartford
 Laura Hamilton (born 1982), TV presenter (A Place in the Sun), attended Dartford Grammar School for Girls
 Paul Hartnoll (born 1968) and Phil Hartnoll (born 1964), electronic musicians and members of the band Orbital
 Henry Havelock (1795–1857), military general
 Jimmy Havoc (born 1984), professional wrestler
 Barry Hawkins (born 1979), professional snooker player
 Terry Hollands (born 1979), Britain's Strongest Man (2007)
 Henry Ambrose Hunt (1866–1946), meteorologist
 Mick Jagger (born 1943), vocalist and songwriter, The Rolling Stones
 Diane Keen (born 1946), actress
 Sidney Keyes (1922–1943), war poet
 John Latham (1743–1837), ornithologist
 Nick Lee (born 1983), cricketer
 Phil May (born 1944), vocalist, The Pretty Things
 Patrick Mackay (born 1952), serial killer
 Matt Morgan (born 1977), comedy writer, The Original Victim
 Topsy Ojo (born 1985), London Irish and England rugby union full-back, attended Dartford Grammar School
 Min Patel (born 1970), Kent and England cricketer
 Keith Richards (born 1943), guitarist and songwriter, The Rolling Stones
 Steve Rider (born 1950), TV sports presenter
 David Russell (born 1957), golfer
 Paul Samson (1953–2002), rock guitarist
 Jeffrey Snowden (born 1973), former cricketer
 Alfred Sturge (1816–1901), pastor and missionary
 Dick Taylor (born 1943), guitarist, The Pretty Things
 Margaret Thatcher (1925–2013), Prime Minister who unsuccessfully ran to be MP of Dartford in 1950 and 1951
 Pete Tong (born 1960), house DJ
 Richard Trevithick (1771–1833), inventor and mining engineer, died in Dartford
 Mary Ann Lake Wallis (1821–1910), New Zealand orphanage matron
 Andy Wilmot (born 1980), racing driver
 William James Erasmus Wilson (1809–1884), surgeon

References

Bibliography
 Kent History Illustrated - Frank W Jessup (KCC, 1966)
 Railways of the Southern Region - Geoffrey Body (PSL Field Guide 1989)
 The History and Antiquities of Dartford, with Topographical Notices of the Neighbourhood (1844) - John Dunkin, Google Books

External links

 The Dartford town archive
 
 Dartford Town Guide
 
 Two maps of the area c.1800
 

Towns in Kent
Market towns in Kent
Port of London
Populated places on the River Thames
Unparished areas in Kent